Michael Madhusudan Dutta College, (also known as MMD College), established in 1987, is a general degree college in Sabroom, South Tripura. It offers undergraduate courses in arts and sciences. It is affiliated to  Tripura University.  The college is recognized by the University Grants Commission (UGC).

See also
Education in India
Education in Tripura
Michael Madhusudan Dutt
Tripura University
Literacy in India
List of institutions of higher education in Tripura

References

External links
http://www.mmdcollege.in/

Colleges affiliated to Tripura University
Educational institutions established in 1987
Universities and colleges in Tripura
1987 establishments in Tripura
Colleges in Tripura